Shiv Chalisa  (Hindi: शिव  चालीसा, literally Forty  on Shiva) is a devotional stotra dedicated to Hindu deity Lord Shiva. Adapted from the Shiva Purana, it consists of 40 (chalis)  (verses) and recited daily or on special festivals like Maha Shivaratri by Shivaites, and worshippers of Shiva.

See also
 Hanuman Chalisa, Hindu devotional hymn

Further reading
 ''Sri Shiv Chalisa (Dicritical)', by Manoj Pub. Ed. Board. Manoj Publications, 2009. .

References

Indian literature
Hindi-language literature
Shaiva texts